Raising Children Network is an Australian website launched in 2006. It is funded by the Australian Government as a means to produce and maintain educational tools and resources for families raising children in Australia.

History
The Raising Children website, which was launched in May 2006, is a resource for parenting information in Australia. It is a comprehensive website covering information required for raising children provided to new and expecting parents. 

As a companion to the Raising Children website and to extend its reach, the Raising Children DVD was produced in 2007.

In November 2007, Australia became the first country in the world to initiate a universal parenting education program when it started distributing the companion Raising Children DVD to every family in the country, at the birth of their child in the hospital. Over 250,000 are distributed each year.

The Raising Children DVD contains five hours of content — divided into three short movies, Newborn, Baby and Child and a section called ‘What About Me?’  It takes advantage of basic DVD technology to provide users with a fully interactive experience which enables them to opt into extended content topics and demonstration clips while watching the main videos.

Its effectiveness, according to the Australian Council for Educational Research (ACER) independent evaluation, is due to a combination of factors including: the quality of production, the primary use of documentary style parent interviews, a comedic host and the inclusion of visual demonstrations of key skills, like breastfeeding and safe bathing.

In 2007 the Raising Children website and DVD swept the relevant interactive media awards in Australia.  The Raising Children DVD won the Australian Interactive Media Industry Association (AIMIA) award for the Best Learning & Education category.  The expert judges commented that the DVD is,
“in essence an interactive documentary for parents & carers, allowing them to explore and engage with information about parenting that enables the active construction of knowledge.”

The Raising Children website won the AIMIA award for the Best Non-profit & Government category with judges commending the site’s innovative features: 
“The pop-up glossary terms are a fantastic solution to get information quickly and effectively to the user without sending them to a whole different page, and Make a Book is an invaluable function for tired parents to be able to refer back to without logging on.”

The Raising Children website also won the NetGuide Australian Web Awards Best Parenting Website and took home their highest honour, 2007 Site of the Year as well. According to NetGuide, RCN “takes a huge topic — parenting — and presents masses of useful and reliable information in a well-designed site that’s a delight to visit”.

In 2009, the Australian Government announced funding for the Raising Children website to extend the parenting content to include parenting adolescents and teenagers up to 16 years of age, which will be available in 2010.

In 2017, the website claimed a total of over 14 million visitors.

Network structure

Three non profit organisations form the consortium behind the Raising Children Network which are responsible for its projects are
 The Parenting Research Centre, which is responsible for content development & quality assurance,
 Smart Population Foundation, which is responsible for design, web development, content optimisation & communications and
 The Murdoch Children’s Research Institute’s Centre for Community Child Health at the Royal Children's Hospital, Melbourne, which is responsible for project and stakeholder management and evaluation.

References

External links
 
 Anxiety in Children - ABC
 

Internet properties established in 2006
Parenting in Australia
Parenting websites
Government-owned websites of Australia